Chris Gray  may refer to:
Chris Gray (American football) (born 1970), offensive lineman for the Seattle Seahawks
Chris Gray (rugby player) (born 1960), rugby player for the Scotland national rugby union team
Chris Gray (situationist) (1942–2009), activist in the Situationist International
Chris Gray (Coronation Street), a fictional character on British soap opera Coronation Street
Chris Gray (video game developer), video game developer of Fiendish Freddy's Big Top O'Fun
Chris Gray, vocalist for the band The Black Maria